Pseudorsidis griseomaculatus is a species of beetle in the family Cerambycidae, and the only species in the genus Pseudorsidis. It was described by Pic in 1916.

References

Lamiini
Beetles described in 1916